

Before 500 BC

5th century BC

4th century BC

3rd century BC

2nd century BC

1st century BC

1st century

2nd century

3rd century

See also
 List of Roman battles

References

0000